Germanium tetrafluoride (GeF4) is a chemical compound of germanium and fluorine. It is a colorless gas.

Synthesis
Germanium tetrafluoride is formed by treating germanium with fluorine:
 Ge + 2 F2 → GeF4
Alternatively germanium dioxide combines with hydrofluoric acid (HF):
 GeO2 + 4 HF → GeF4  +  2 H2O

It is also formed during the thermal decomposition of a complex salt, Ba[GeF6]:
 Ba(GeF6) → GeF4 + BaF2

Properties
Germanium tetrafluoride is a noncombustible, strongly fuming gas with a garlic-like odor. It reacts with water to form hydrofluoric acid and germanium dioxide. Decomposition occurs above 1000 °C.

Reaction of GeF4 with fluoride sources produces GeF5− anions with octahedral coordination around Ge atom due to polymerization. The structural characterization of a discrete trigonal bipyramidal GeF5− anion was achieved by a "naked" fluoride reagent 1,3-bis(2,6-diisopropylphenyl)imidazolium fluoride.

Uses
In combination with disilane, germanium tetrafluoride is used for in  the synthesis of SiGe.

References

External links
 "Reactivity of a Naked Fluoride Reagent and Controlled Design of Germanium Fluorido-Anions."

Germanium(IV) compounds
Gases
Fluorides
Metal halides